Noronen is a surname. Notable people with the surname include:

Mika Noronen (born 1979), Finnish ice hockey player
Riikka Noronen (born 1982), Finnish ice hockey player
Roope Noronen (born 1974), Finnish sport administrator

Finnish-language surnames